The 1966 Grantland Rice Bowl was an NCAA College Division game following the 1966 season, between the Tennessee State Tigers and the Muskingum Fighting Muskies. Tennessee State quarterback Eldridge Dickey was named the game's most valuable player.

Notable participants
Multiple players from Tennessee State were selected in the  1967 NFL/AFL Draft – running back Bill Tucker, defensive back Alvin Coleman, return specialist Noland Smith, defensive back Leon Moore, running back Eugens Bowens, and defensive back Howard Finley. Additional Tennessee State players were selected in the 1968 NFL/AFL Draft – defensive end Claude Humphrey, quarterback Eldridge Dickey, wide receiver John Robinson, wide receiver Leo Johnson, and guard Tommy Davis. Humphrey was inducted to the Pro Football Hall of Fame in 2014. Running back Cid Edwards was not drafted, but later played in the NFL. Muskingum running back Rick Harbold was inducted to his university's hall of fame in 1985.

Both head coaches have been inducted to the College Football Hall of Fame – John Merritt of Tennessee State in 1994, and Ed Sherman of Muskingum in 1996.

Scoring summary

Play set a TSU record for longest touchdown reception.

References

Grantland Rice Bowl
Grantland Rice Bowl
Muskingum Fighting Muskies football bowl games
Tennessee State Tigers football bowl games
Murfreesboro, Tennessee
December 1966 sports events in the United States
Grantland Rice